UCHS can mean one of the following:

Union City High School (New Jersey), a grades 10 - 12 high school in Union City, New Jersey
Union City High School (Tennessee) in Union City, Tennessee
University City High School (Missouri)
University City High School (San Diego)
Unity Christian High School (Barrie)